IF Elfsborg is a Swedish professional football club based in Borås. In 2012 Elfsborg, played their 69th season in Allsvenskan from its inception in 1924 up to and including the 2012 season. This placing them on a 5th place of those teams who have participated in total seasons. They have also played top flight football continually in Sweden since 1997, which currently is the 3rd longest top flight tenure of any club in Sweden—the longest one is IFK Göteborg, since 1977.

The club is currently placed 5th in the all-time Allsvenskan table, "maratontabellen" in Swedish, which is a cumulative record of all match results, points, and goals of every team that has played in Allsvenskan since its inception in 1924–25. Furthermore, Elfsborg is placed 6th in the all-time medal table, with a total of 24 medals of different value – the most recent received in 2012.

The player in IF Elfsborg who holds most club and national records is Sven Jonasson. In 409 games, most appearances ever in Elfsborg, he scored a total of 252 goals in Allsvenskan, which makes it an all-time record. He played in Elfsborg throughout his career, which started in 1927 and ended 1947, a total of 20 years. The most remarkable achievement is his unbroken record of 344 consecutive games. A sequence that was broken when he missed his first game in 14 years because he failed to receive furlough during his military service. He was also the first goalscorer ever for the Sweden national football team in a World Cup. It was in the 1934 FIFA World Cup, where he scored two goals in Sweden's 3–2 victory against Argentina. 

This article is about the statistics and records of the football section of IF Elfsborg.

Honours

Domestic

Swedish Champions:
 Winners (6): 1935–36, 1938–39, 1939–40, 1961, 2006, 2012

League 
Allsvenskan:
Winners (6): 1935–36, 1938–39, 1939–40, 1961, 2006, 2012
Runners-up (6): 1942–43, 1943–44, 1944–45, 1965, 1977, 2008
Division 1 Södra:
 Winners (1): 1996
Runners-up (1): 1991
Division 2 Götaland:
 Winners (1): 1960
Runners-up (4): 1955–56, 1956–57, 1957–58, 1959
Division 2 Västsvenska Serien:
 Winners (1): 1925–26
Runners-up (2): 1914–15, 1923–24

Cups 
Svenska Cupen:
Winners (2): 2001, 2003
Runners-up (3): 1942, 1980–81, 1996–97
Svenska Supercupen:
Winners (1): 2007

European 
 UEFA Intertoto Cup:
 Winners (2): 1980, 2008
 Runners-up (1): 1961
 The Atlantic Cup:
 Winners (1): 2011

Player records

Appearances
 Most Allsvenskan appearances: Sven Jonasson, 409
 Most consecutive appearances: Sven Jonasson, 344 (1927–41)

Most appearances

Competitive matches only, includes appearances as substitute. Numbers in brackets indicate goals scored.

Goalscorers
 Most Allsvenskan goals: Sven Jonasson, 252

Top goalscorers

Competitive matches only. Numbers in brackets indicate appearances made.

International
 Most capped Elfsborg player for Sweden while playing for the club: Anders Svensson, 89 caps whilst an Elfsborg player

Club records

Matches
 Biggest victory, Svenska cupen: 19–0 vs. Varbergs BoIS, 21 January 1996*

Record wins
 Record win: 19–0 (against Varbergs BoIS, Svenska Cupen, 21 January 1996)
 Record Allsvenskan win: 12–2 (against IFK Eskilstuna, 19 April 1936)
 Record European win: 8–0 (against 8–0 vs. Floriana F.C., UEFA Europa League, 5 July 2012
 Record home win: Allsvenskan: 10–1 (against Degerfors IF, 28 August 1938)

Record defeats
 Record Allsvenskan defeat: Allsvenskan: 0–7 (against GAIS, 25 August 1926)

Attendances
Only competitive first-team matches are considered.
 Highest home attendance: 22,654 (against IFK Norrköping, Allsvenskan, 1961) at Ryavallen
 Highest attendance at Borås Arena: 17,070 (against Kalmar FF, Allsvenskan, 4 July 2005)
 Highest attendance at Ramnavallen: 16,340 (against AIK, Allsvenskan, 7 June 1936)
 Highest average attendance: 14,608 (1961 season)
 Highest away attendance: 48,296 (against IFK Göteborg, 2 June 1977) at Ullevi

References

Records
IF Elfsborg